Lookaway Hall, built from 1895 to 1898, is a North Augusta, South Carolina landmark. A number of architectural details are significant, for the home was built in the Beaux Arts and Revival styles, made popular after the World's Columbian Exposition. This accessible landmark, near the historic Georgia Avenue-Butler Avenue Historic District, was listed in the National Register of Historic Places on August 13, 1992.

References

Houses on the National Register of Historic Places in South Carolina
Beaux-Arts architecture in South Carolina
Houses completed in 1898
Houses in Aiken County, South Carolina
National Register of Historic Places in Aiken County, South Carolina
North Augusta, South Carolina